Site Anubis is an album by Paul Schütze and Phantom City, released in 1996 through Big Cat Records. It is a concept album in which urban catastrophe is caused by an 800-foot statue of the Egyptian god Anubis.

Background and recording
Though the album credits all songs as being written by Paul Schütze, Schütze has said that "None of it was written - it was all improvised." The album was recorded through dubbing parts played by musicians who never met in person; bassist Bill Laswell played over Schütze's electronics in New York, then passed the results to drummer Dirk Wachtelaer in Brussels, who recorded his parts and then passed the music on to the next performer.

Several of the album's musicians united for live performances, which are documented on Shiva Recoil: Live/Unlive (1997).

Track listing

Personnel 
Musicians
Raoul Björkenheim – guitar
Alex Buess – bass clarinet and contrabass clarinet on "An Early Mutation", "Blue Like Petrol" and "Ten Acre Ghost"; additional engineering and mixing
Lol Coxhill – soprano saxophone on "Eight Legs Out of Limbo" and "Inflammable Shadow"
Julian Priester – trombone on "The Big God Blows In" and "Eight Legs Out of Limbo"
Bill Laswell – bass guitar
Paul Schütze – keyboards, tape, sampler, production, engineering, mixing, design
Dirk Wachtelaer – drums
Production and additional personnel
Denis Blackham – mastering
Anne-Louise Falsone – design
Andrew Hulme – engineering
Tsunehisa Kimura – photography

References 

1996 albums
Big Cat Records albums
Paul Schütze albums
Albums produced by Paul Schütze